The Premier Futsal League was an Indian franchise-based futsal league conceptualised by Indian entrepreneurs under the entity of Premier Futsal Management Pvt. Ltd. It was founded by Abhinandan Balasubramanian, Dinesh Raj and Nithyashree Subban, backed by business magnate Xavier Britto and his wife, philanthropist Vimala Britto.

Format

Each playing team consists of three international futsal players, one international marquee football player and one Indian futsal player. Every squad is allowed a maximum of twelve players.

Premier Futsal conducted a talent hunt programme across eight cities called Launchpad to scout and select Indian players. The programme combed through 2500 participants per city to shortlist five regional players for each team. Mumbai 5's won the inaugural Premier Futsal by defeating Kochi 5's in the penalty shootout.

Management team
 Xavier Britto - Chairman & investor of Premier Futsal, founder & chairman of Estell group of hotels & Kerry Indev Logistics & Indev Logistics
 Dinesh Raj - Managing director of Premier Futsal, Guinness World Record holder for creating the India's largest human national flag 
 Abhinandan Balasubramanian - CEO of Premier Futsal, founder of AltFlo & ChefHost
 Nithyashree Subban - Director of Finance & Strategy, Premier Futsal 
 Vimala Britto - Director of Premier Futsal, Correspondent - Britto Group of Colleges, founder & chairperson - Seek Foundation, a non-profit organization

Brand ambassadors
Indian cricket team batsman Virat Kohli has joined the Premier Futsal  as its brand ambassador.

Premier Futsal attracted a lot of fans when they signed the one of the best futsal players in the world, Alessandro Rosa Vieira, popularly known as Falcão.

On 12 May 2016, Virat Kohli along with Falcão facilitated the launch of the nationwide talent hunt to select 40 players who will represent their respective cities in the first season of Premier Futsal.

Anthem
The Premier Futsal anthem Naam Hai Futsal had its tunes set by two-time Academy Award winner A.R.Rahman with vocals also provided by Karthik, Lady Kash and Virat Kohli.

Previous teams

Results

By season

Telecast
Sony Pictures Networks India Pvt. Ltd. acquired exclusive rights to broadcast Premier Futsal. As part of the agreement, all Premier Futsal matches will be televised live on Sony SIX, Sony ESPN and Sony Aath. Matches will also be available to live stream on Sony LIV.

In Indonesia, all Premier Futsal matches also broadcast live on nonton.com (2016 only) and Super Soccer TV (from 2017).

See also
Football in India
AFC Futsal Asian Cup
AFC Futsal Club Championship
FIFA Futsal World Cup
AIFF Futsal Club Championship
Minifootball
Five-a-side football
Indoor soccer

References

External links
 

2016 establishments in India
Futsal competitions in Asia
Futsal in India
 
Professional sports leagues in India
Sports leagues established in 2016